The Thomas Balch Library is a history and genealogy library located in Leesburg, Virginia. The library, owned and operated by the town of Leesburg, serves as a designated Underground Railroad research site and has an active research program.

History
The library was incorporated in 1918. The architect for the library was Waddy Butler Wood. In 1922, the Thomas Balch Library was constructed in Leesburg, Virginia as a memorial to historian Thomas Balch, a Leesburg native. Thomas Willing Balch (1866-1927) and Edwin Swift Balch (1856-1927), sons of Thomas Balch, originally endowed the subscription library. The Library is part of the Leesburg Historic District.

The Thomas Balch Library operated for fifty years under a private Board of Trustees. The library was staffed by volunteers and part-time employees. In 1960 the library dropped its subscription and became a free, though segregated, public library. It was desegregated in 1965. In 1973, the Loudoun County Public Library system was established. The Thomas Balch Library joined as a full service public library branch in 1974, alongside the Purcellville, Purcellville Bookmobile and Sterling libraries.

In 1994, ownership of the Thomas Balch Library was transferred from the Loudoun County Public Library system to the Town of Leesburg. Under the Town of Leesburg, the library began operating as a history and genealogy library. The Martin L. Cook photograph collection was acquired by the library in 2008. Cook was commissioned after training at the Tuskegee Army Flying School and went on to serve in the U.S. Navy in the Department of Defense as an aeronautical engineer.

In 2003 a Palladio Award in the category "Traditional Buildings" was given to Bowie Gridley Architects for a "sympathetic" addition to the Library building. The addition doubled the size of the 1922 building.

In 2013, the state legislature passed a special bill enabling the Library to receive a gift of $618,000 left to it by Virginia L. Bowie, a Leesburg resident and longtime library volunteer. The Library also holds an annual fundraising event at various local historic sites.

Services
The Thomas Balch Library offers patrons many services. Reference services include general collection research, and also manuscripts, archives, and rare book research.

Internet access is available on specified computer terminals. Interlibrary loan services are also available to patrons, with a small fee.

Reproduction services are also offered. These services are either self-serve or employee-assisted when special handling is required for specific materials. Reproduction services include both written information and photographs.

Loudoun History Awards
Every year, the Thomas Balch Library presents the Loudoun History Awards. These awards are sponsored by the Thomas Balch Library Advisory Commission. The awards were established to recognize contributions of local historian John Elbert Devine (1911-1996), in preserving Loudoun County history. The Loudoun History Awards were initially started in 1993.

Research
In February 2012 the library published work connecting slaves with their modern-day descendants.

The library now serves as a designated Underground Railroad research site.

On March 31, 2010, the Thomas Balch Library and George Mason University announced an agreement for academic cooperation.

References

External links 
 
 Friends of Thomas Balch Library

Public libraries in Virginia
Library buildings completed in 1922
Historic district contributing properties in Virginia
Libraries on the National Register of Historic Places in Virginia
National Register of Historic Places in Loudoun County, Virginia